Victor Edward Doddsworth (2 October 1911 – 1986) was an English professional footballer who played as a wing half.

References

1911 births
1986 deaths
People from Mexborough
Footballers from Doncaster
English footballers
Association football wing halves
Gainsborough Trinity F.C. players
Grimsby Town F.C. players
Manchester United F.C. players
Doncaster Rovers F.C. players
English Football League players